Bajo Calima is a village in Buenaventura Municipality, Valle del Cauca Department in Colombia.

Climate
Bajo Calima has an extremely wet tropical rainforest climate (Af).

References

Populated places in the Valle del Cauca Department